Out of Nature is a 2014 Norwegian comedy film written, co-directed by and starring Ole Giæver with Marte Vold as co-director. It was screened in the Contemporary World Cinema section at the 2014 Toronto International Film Festival. It was screened in the Panorama section of the 65th Berlin International Film Festival in February 2015. The film was nominated for the 2015 Nordic Council Film Prize.

Cast
 Ole Giæver as Martin
 Trond Peter Stamsø Munch as Far
 Marte Magnusdotter Solem as Signe
 Rebekka Nystabakk as Helle
 Sivert Giæver Solem as Karsten

References

External links
 

2014 films
2014 comedy films
Norwegian comedy films
2010s Norwegian-language films